Paul Kaczan (born 3 February 1983) in Scotland) is a Scottish former footballer who plays for Elgin City.

Club career
During his career, Kaczan has played for the Celtic Boys Club, Heart of Midlothian, Alloa Athletic, Partick Thistle. and Elgin City.

He currently plays for Elgin City in Scottish League Two, where he was captain.

References

External links 

1983 births
Living people
Scottish footballers
Association football defenders
Scottish Premier League players
Scottish Football League players
Heart of Midlothian F.C. players
Elgin City F.C. players
Place of birth missing (living people)